Liddell-McNinch House is a historic home located at Charlotte, Mecklenburg County, North Carolina. It was built between 1891 and 1893, and is a -story, Queen Anne / Shingle Style frame dwelling. The house has a highly complex roofline of projections, gables, porches, and spreading eaves, and wall surfaces of weatherboards, shingles, broken planes, swells, and cavities. It features a wraparound porch and a recessed porch on the second level. President William Howard Taft visited the McNinch House in 1909.

The house is named for two of its previous owners, Vinton Liddell, and Charlotte mayor Samuel S. McNinch. It was listed on the National Register of Historic Places in 1976.

References

Houses on the National Register of Historic Places in North Carolina
Queen Anne architecture in North Carolina
Shingle Style architecture in North Carolina
Houses completed in 1893
Houses in Charlotte, North Carolina
National Register of Historic Places in Mecklenburg County, North Carolina